Guy G. McFadden  (September 3, 1872 – March 10, 1911) was a first baseman for the St. Louis Browns of the National League in 1895. His professional career also included stops in the Southwest League (1891), Western Association (1893–1894), Western Interstate League (1895), Eastern Iowa League (1895), Southern Association (1896) and Canadian League (1899).

External links
 

1872 births
1911 deaths
19th-century baseball players
Baseball players from Kansas
St. Louis Browns (NL) players
Major League Baseball first basemen
Topeka Capitals players
Des Moines Prohibitionists players
St. Joseph Saints players
Columbus Babies players
Columbus River Snipes players
London Cockneys players